Cub Creek is a stream in northern Miller County in the U.S. state of Missouri. It is a tributary of the Osage River.

The stream headwaters arise southeast of the community of Marys Home (at ) and it flows generally southeast before turning east in a  broad bend to enter the Osage (at ). The confluence is about two miles north of Capps and two miles west of St. Elizabeth.

Cub Creek most likely was named for bear cubs in the area.

See also
List of rivers of Missouri

References

Rivers of Miller County, Missouri
Rivers of Missouri